is a Japanese politician who has served as the Speaker of the House of Representatives of Japan since November 2021. He is also a member of the House of Representatives since 1990, and served as Chief Cabinet Secretary in Junichiro Koizumi's Cabinet from 2004 to 2005, and as Secretary-General of the Liberal Democratic Party from 2008 to 2009.

Early life 
Hosoda was born in Matsue, Shimane Prefecture on April 5, 1944. He graduated from the Law Faculty of the University of Tokyo, and worked at the Ministry of International Trade and Industry from 1967 to 1986, serving as Director of the Washington Office of Japan National Oil Corporation from 1983 to 1985, and as Director of the Price Policy Division in the Industrial Policy Bureau from 1985 to 1986.

Political career 
Hosoda left government service in 1986 to become a secretary to his father, Kichizo Hosoda (1912-2007), who was then a member of the House of Representatives. He was elected to the House of Representatives for the first time in the 1990 general election, representing the Shimane Prefecture at-large district, which had previously been his father's constituency.

Koizumi government 
Prime Minister Junichiro Koizumi appointed Hosoda to the Cabinet posts of Minister of State for Okinawa and Northern Territories Affairs, Minister of State for Science and Technology Policy, and Minister of State for IT Policy in 2002. Hosoda became Deputy Chief Cabinet Secretary in September 2003, and was promoted to Chief Cabinet Secretary and Minister of State for Gender Equality following Yasuo Fukuda's resignation in May 2004.

Aso government 
After Taro Aso was elected to the LDP presidency and became Prime Minister, Hosoda was appointed Secretary-General of the LDP. He served in this post from September 2008 to September 2009, when he resigned following the party's historic defeat in the 2009 general election.

Abe government 
Following Shinzo Abe's victory in the 2012 LDP presidential election, Abe appointed Hosoda to head the Seiwa Seisaku Kenkyukai (Seiwa-kai), the largest faction in the party, replacing Nobutaka Machimura. The faction is now commonly known as the "Hosoda faction."

Hosoda briefly served as Acting LDP Secretary-General following Sadakazu Tanigaki's hospitalization for a spinal cord injury in July 2016. In August 2016, Hosoda was appointed Chairman of the LDP General Council.

Hosoda chaired the LDP's 2018 task force on reforming the Constitution of Japan, drawing up a four-point revision proposal in March 2018 that included an amendment to Article 9 to make explicit reference to the Self-Defense Forces. Abe named Hosoda as head of the LDP Headquarters for the Promotion of Revision of the Constitution in September 2019, replacing Hakubun Shimomura, who was viewed as more "dogmatic" than Hosoda and had antagonized opposition parties.

Hosoda was a member of the LDP Parliamentary Group on the Promotion and Conservation of Japanese Sword and Ironwork Culture, which supported subsidies for Tatara steel.

Personal life 
Hosoda enjoys playing contract bridge.

References

External links
  Official website

|-

1944 births
Living people
People from Shimane Prefecture
University of Tokyo alumni
Members of the House of Representatives (Japan)
Government ministers of Japan
Liberal Democratic Party (Japan) politicians
21st-century Japanese politicians
Politicians from Shimane Prefecture
Speakers of the House of Representatives (Japan)